Fuessenich Park is a baseball field located in downtown Torrington, Connecticut, United States, with a capacity of 1,500 fans. It has twice been home to summer collegiate baseball league teams during their tenures in the city.

Tenant History
The field was home to the Torrington Titans of the Futures Collegiate Baseball League from 2010 to 2016. Prior to the Titans, the field was home to the Torrington Twisters of the New England Collegiate Baseball League (NECBL) from 1997 to 2008.  It hosted two NECBL All-Star Games, one in 1998 and one in 2008.  The park was home to the Torrington Braves of the Colonial League for the 1950 season.

The field has also been home to the American Legion Baseball League team for high school age players, the Tri-State Baseball League team for post-high school players, and additional organized baseball leagues and events for middle school and high school players.

External links
 Torrington Titans website
 FCBL website
 Fuessenich Park photo gallery at digitalballparks.com

Notes

Baseball venues in Connecticut
Futures Collegiate Baseball League ballparks
Buildings and structures in Torrington, Connecticut